Graeme John Nesbitt (27 November 1950 – 14 May 2000) was a music, arts and radio promoter from New Zealand.

Biography
Nesbitt made an immense contribution to the New Zealand music industry. He was instrumental in starting and furthering the careers of such well known New Zealand entertainers as Jenny Morris, Dragon and the magician Tim Woon.

Nesbitt was responsible for the development of the New Zealand Festival of the Arts (Student arts Council), Summer City (Wellington) that he took over from Rohesia Hamilton Metcalf, New Zealand Music Awards, New Zealand Sports Hall of Fame.

In 1972 Nesbitt was appointed as the first Director of the New Zealand Students Arts Council. In the same year he took a management role with the New Zealand band Mammal and they released the album Beware the Man (1972) with poet Sam Hunt.

In February 1974 Nesbitt became the manager of the band Dragon and they released their acclaimed album Universal Radio (1974).

Over the 1980s, Nesbitt was hired as the promo manager at Radio Windy and also did a stint at 2ZB Wellington. In the early 1990s, he was back in the Radio game with working as ZMFM / 91ZM Wellington as the Promotions Manager.

References

1950 births
2000 deaths
People from Auckland
20th-century New Zealand businesspeople